The Canadian Army Journal abbreviated as CAJ, is a quarterly peer-reviewed academic journal published by the Canadian Army in English and French. It was established in 1947.

History
The journal was established in 1947 with Jack G. DeProse as founding editor-in-chief. Preceded by the Canadian Army Training Memorandum which was published from 1941 to 1947, it ceased publication in June 1965 amidst reform within the Department of National Defence seeking to unify the journals of the Canadian Armed Forces. In 1965 the Canadian Army Journal, the Navy's The Crowsnest and the Air Force's The Roundel were merged to form the Canadian Forces Sentinel, which changed its name to simply Sentinel in 1973 and ceased publication in 1994. The Canadian Army Journal was effectively succeeded in 1980 by the Canadian Army Doctrine Bulletin, which was revamped into the Army Doctrine and Training Bulletin in August 1998. The journal returned to its original name in 2004.

Past Editors

References

External links
 

Military journals
Multilingual journals
Quarterly journals
Canadian Army
Publications established in 1947
1947 establishments in Canada
Academic journals published by governments
English-language journals
French-language journals